Gurr is a surname, and may refer to:

 Andrew Gurr (born 1936), New Zealand scholar of Shakespeare and English Renaissance theatre
 Andrew Gurr (governor), English politician, governor of Saint Helena, 2007-11
 Bob Gurr (born 1931), American amusement ride designer
 Charlotte Gurr (born 1989), English footballer
 Craig Gurr (born 1973), Zimbabwean cricketer
 David Gurr (born 1936), Canadian writer of literary novels and political thrillers
 David Gurr (cricketer) (born 1956), English cricketer
 Donna Gurr (born 1955), Canadian swimmer
 Doug Gurr, British businessman
 Joshua Gurr (1819–1910), South Australian businessman
 Lena Gurr (1897-1992), American artist
 Mark Gurr (born 1966), Zimbabwe tennis player
 Marty Gurr (born 1958), Australian rugby league footballer
 Ted Robert Gurr (born 1936), US psychologist, author of Why Men Rebel
 Tom Gurr (1904–1995), Australian journalist and documentary filmmaker

See also
 GURR, German garage band